Markt Wald is a municipality in the district of Unterallgäu in Bavaria, Germany.

Christoph Scheiner was born in Markt Wald.

References

Unterallgäu